The  is a kei car built by the Japanese automaker Daihatsu from 1999 to 2004. It was first presented at the Tokyo Motor Show in 1997. It was available with a 658 cc petrol engine paired with either front- or four-wheel drive system. The styling included features such as ridges in the doors and exposed hinges and bolts, designed to make the car appear rugged. The Naked was an early example of styling features from off-roaders being used on road cars; this idea has since been used on cars such as the Rover Streetwise, Citroën C3 XTR and Volkswagen CrossPolo. The interior styling has similarities to that of the original Fiat Panda, with plastic mouldings that resemble the fabric on the Panda's dashboard.

References 

Naked
Cars introduced in 1999
2000s cars
Kei cars
Kei sport utility vehicles
Hatchbacks
Front-wheel-drive vehicles
All-wheel-drive vehicles